|}

The Doonside Cup is a Listed flat horse race in Great Britain open to horses aged three years or older. It is run at Ayr over a distance of 1 mile and 2 furlongs (2,012 metres), and it is scheduled to take place each year in September. It is currently held on the final day of Ayr's three-day Ayr Gold Cup Festival (previously the Western Meeting).

Winners since 1988

See also
 Horse racing in Great Britain
 List of British flat horse races

References

 Paris-Turf: 
, 
 Racing Post:

Flat races in Great Britain
Ayr Racecourse
Open middle distance horse races